Morrison Lake may refer to:

Morrison Lake (Minnesota), a lake in Cass County
Morrison Lake (Ontario)